Ibrahim Badamasi Babangida University (IBBUL) is a university in Niger State, central Nigeria. It had its first convocation in 2014. It was named after the former Nigeria Head of State General Ibrahim Babangida. The university started academic activities in the 2005/2006 academic session.

Faculties 
 Natural Sciences
 Management and Social Sciences
 Applied Sciences and Technology
 Education and Arts
 Agriculture
 Languages and Communication Studies
 College of Health Sciences

Institutes 
 Institutes of Maritime Studies

Endowments & Research 
In 2020, IBBUL won a prize grant of $450,000 from the International Development Research Centre (IDRC) grant of Canada. The project has the Tata Institute of Social Sciences (TISS), Mumbai, India, as the lead partner, with IBBUL and Samtse College of Education, Royal University of Bhutan, Open University of Tanzania and UNESCO office of Bangladesh, in the partnership.

In 2021, the Nigerian National Petroleum Corporation endowed the University with a High Impact Geological Research Laboratory.

Gallery

References

2005 establishments in Nigeria
Educational institutions established in 2005
Education in Niger State
 
Public universities in Nigeria